France Bleu Nord is a French public radio station part of the France Bleu network for the departments of Nord and Pas-de-Calais.

History
France Bleu Nord was established on 19 May 1980 and was dubbed Fréquence Nord by Radio France journalist Jacqueline Baudrier.

On September 4, 2000, 38 local stations of Radio France and Radio Bleue partnered together to become France Bleu. After this, the name of Radio France-Fréquence Nord changed to France Bleu Nord.

Frequencies

Nord (59)
 Dunkerque : 92.6 MHz
 Lille : 87.8 MHz (city), 94.7 (Nord)
 Maubeuge : 88.1 MHz
 Valenciennes : 87.7

Pas-de-Calais (62)
 Auxi-le-Château : 95.6 MHz
 Boulogne-sur-Mer : 95.5 MHz
 Calais : 106.2 MHz
 Étaples : 97.8 MHz
 Marconne : 94.3 MHz

Belgium
France Bleu Nord can also be heard clearly in the south-west area of Belgium:
 Bruges : 94.7 MHz
 Courtray : 94.7 MHz
 Mons : 88.1 MHz
 Mouscron : 87.8, 94.7 MHz
 Tournai : 94.7 MHz
 Ypres : 87.8 MHz, 94.7 MHz

References

External links
France Bleu
Radio France Website

Radio stations in France
Radio stations established in 1980
Radio France
1980 establishments in France